Ghulam Husain Ali Khan (8 January 1748 – 15 July 1801) aka Ghulam Hussainy or Umdat ul-Umra, was the Nawab of the Carnatic state in the Mughal Empire from 1795 to 1801.

He was actually named by his grandfather, Anwaruddin Khan, as "Abdul Wali". But he was subsequently renamed as "Umdat ul-Umara", after the name of the court of the Mughal Emperor Shah Alam II.

Early life 
Umdat ul-Umara was the son of Muhammad Ali Khan Walahjah, a stern ally of the British East India Company.

He was appointed Naib Subah of Nattharnagar (1759–1760), and Subah of Arcot (1760), and raised to the title of Umdat ul-Umara by Emperor Shah Alam II, through the intercession of Robert Clive, 12 August 1765.

Reign 
Umdat ul-Umara succeeded on the death of his father 13th and installed on the musnaid 16 October 1795. He ruled from 1795 to 1801. During his reign, the British East India Company demanded pieces of land as gifts.

Many members of the East India Company believed that Umdat ul-Umara, as the Nawab of Carnatic, had secretly provided assistance to Tipu Sultan during the Fourth Anglo-Mysore War . On the fall of Tipu Sultan in 1799, immediately, the British accused the Nawab of collaborating with Tipu Sultan, and demanded the entire administration of the kingdom as indemnity.

Umdat ul-Umara resisted the demands of the East India Company. He died, perhaps poisoned by the Company, soon afterwards.  The British takeover of Umdat ul-Umara's domain occurred during the reign of his nephew and successor, Azim-ud-Daula.  As soon as Azim-ud-Daula ascended the throne, on 31 July 1801 he was compelled to sign a Carnatic Treaty handing over the civil and municipal administration of the Carnatic to the British East India Company.  This document provided that Azim-ud-Daula ceded all his lands to British rule, including the territory of the Polygars.

See also
 Nawabs of the Carnatic

External links
 

1748 births
1801 deaths
Indian Muslims
Indian Freemasons
Nawabs of the Carnatic